Zhengzhang Shangfang (9 August 1933 – 19 May 2018) was a Chinese linguist, known for his reconstruction of Old Chinese.

Zhengzhang was born as Zheng Xiangfang in Yongjia County, on the outskirts of Wenzhou. As  and  have the same pronunciation in the Wenzhou dialect, his personal name became Shangfang. While he was in high school, his parents changed his family name to Zhengzhang, a combination of the parents' surnames (Zhèng and Zhāng).

At this time, he became interested in historical phonology and studied the works of Yuen Ren Chao, Wang Li and others at Wenzhou's library. In 1954, unable to enter university to study linguistics, he began geological work in the Beijing area. In his spare time, he continued to develop his own ideas on Old Chinese phonology, particularly the finals and vowel system.  In the 1960s and 1970s, he undertook dialect survey work in Wenzhou for Lü Shuxiang until he was sent to work in a factory during the Cultural Revolution. During a period when the factory was closed due to a factional battle in the Chinese Communist Party, he began exchanging ideas with Pan Wuyun and Jin Shengrong, and refined his Old Chinese system to a six-vowel system.  Essentially the same system was independently developed by William Baxter (building on a proposal by Nicholas Bodman) and by Sergei Starostin.  In 1980, he joined the Chinese Academy of Social Sciences.

Publications

Notes

References

Works cited 
 
 
 

1933 births
2018 deaths
Linguists from China
Chinese phonologists
Educators from Wenzhou
Writers from Wenzhou
Academic staff of Shanghai Normal University
Scientists from Wenzhou
20th-century linguists
21st-century linguists
Linguists of Chinese